Gmina Bolesław may refer to either of the following rural administrative districts in Lesser Poland Voivodeship, Poland:
Gmina Bolesław, Dąbrowa County
Gmina Bolesław, Olkusz County